Belefuanai is a town in Zota District of Bong County, Liberia, near the border of Guinea.

Nearby towns and villages include Gawata (3.4 nm), Belifine (1.2 nm), Bunga (1.0 nm), Gannyou (4.5 nm) and Bonia (2.1 nm).

References

Populated places in Liberia
Bong County